Penicillium longicatenatum is a species of the genus of Penicillium which was isolated from soil in South Africa.

References

longicatenatum
Fungi described in 2014